Tremolecia is a genus of lichen-forming fungi. Members of the Tremolecia are commonly called disc lichens, which may also refer to members of the genus Buellia.

References

Lecanoromycetes
Lecanoromycetes genera
Lichen genera
Taxa described in 1953
Taxa named by Maurice Choisy